Kenya competed at the 1972 Summer Olympics in Munich, West Germany. 57 competitors, 55 men and 2 women, took part in 29 events in 4 sports.

Medalists

Gold
 Kipchoge Keino — Athletics, Men's 3000 metres steeplechase
 Julius Sang, Charles Asati, Munyoro Nyamau, and Robert Ouko — Athletics, Men's 4×400 metre relay

Silver
 Ben Jipcho — Athletics, Men's 3000 metre steeplechase
 Kipchoge Keino — Athletics, Men's 1500 metres
 Philip Waruinge — Boxing, Men's Featherweight

Bronze
 Julius Sang — Athletics, Men's 400 metres
 Mike Boit — Athletics, Men's 800 metres
 Samuel Mbugua — Boxing, Men's Lightweight
 Richard Murunga — Boxing, Men's Welterweight

Athletics

Men's 100 metres
John Mwebi
 First Heat — 10.60s (→ did not advance)

Dan Amuke
 First Heat — 10.76s (→ did not advance)

Men's 800 metres
Mike Boit
 Heat — 1:47.3
 Semifinals — 1:45.9
 Final — 1:46.0 (→  Bronze Medal)

Robert Ouko
 Heat — 1:47.4
 Semifinals — 1:47.6
 Final — 1:46.5 (→ 5th place)

Thomas Saisi
 Heat — 1:48.5 (→ did not advance)

Men's 1500 metres
Kipchoge Keino
 Heat — 3:40.0
 Semifinals — 3:41.2
 Final — 3:36.8 (→  Silver Medal)

Mike Boit
 Heat — 3:42.2
 Semifinals — 3:41.3
 Final — 3:38.4 (→ 4th place)

Cosmas Silei
 Heat — 3:52.0 (→ did not advance)

Men's 5000 metres
Evans Mogaka
 Heat — 13:37.2 (→ did not advance)

Paul Mose
 Heat — 13:41.4 (→ did not advance)

Benjamin Jipcho
 Heat — 13:56.8 (→ did not advance)

Boxing

Men's Flyweight (– 51 kg)
 Felix Maina
 First Round — Bye
 Second Round — Lost to Franco Udella (ITA), 0:5

Men's Welterweight (– 67 kg)
 Richard Murungu →  Bronze Medal
 First Round — Bye
 Second Round — Defeated Alfons Stawski (POL), 4:1
 Third Round — Defeated Vartex Parsanian (IRN), TKO-3
 Quarterfinals — Defeated Sergio Lozano (MEX), KO-1
 Semifinals — Lost to János Kajdi (HUN), 1:4

Men's Light Middleweight (– 71 kg)
David Attan
 First Round — Bye
 Second Round — Lost to Mikko Saarinen (FIN), TKO-2

Hockey

Men's Team Competition
Preliminary Round (Group B)
 Lost to Poland (0-1)
 Lost to Australia (1-3)
 Lost to Netherlands (1-5)
 Lost to Great Britain (0-2)
 Lost to India (2-3)
 Drew with New Zealand (2-2)
 Defeated Mexico (2-1)
Classification Match
 13th/14th place: Defeated Argentina (1-0) after extra time → 13th place

Team Roster
 Resham Bains
 Tarlochan Channa
 Brajinder Daved
 Davinder Deegan
 Phillip Desouza
 Leo Fernandes
 Jagjit Kular
 Ajmal Malik
 Amarjeet Marwa
 Harvinder Marwa
 Surjeet Panesar
 Pereira Reynolds
 Surjit Rihal
 Ranjit Sehmi
 Harvinderpal Sibia
 Avtar Sohal

Shooting

Nine male shooters represented Kenya in 1972.

25 m pistol
 Leonard Bull
 Peter Laurence

50 m pistol
 John Harun
 Abdul Rahman Omar

300 m rifle, three positions
 Dismus Onyiego
 John Muhato

50 m rifle, prone
 Dismus Onyiego
 Simon Ekeno

Trap
 Michael Carr-Hartley
 Brian Carr-Hartley

References

External links
Official Olympic Reports
International Olympic Committee results database

Nations at the 1972 Summer Olympics
1972
1972 in Kenyan sport